The 1997 U.S. Figure Skating Championships took place between February 8 and February 16, 1997, in Nashville, Tennessee. The primary venue was the Nashville Arena and the secondary was the Nashville Municipal Auditorium. Skaters competed in five disciplines across three levels. The disciplines of the competition were men's singles, ladies' singles, pair skating, ice dancing, and compulsory figures. The levels of competition were Senior, Junior, and Novice. Medals were awarded in four colors: gold (first), silver (second), bronze (third), and pewter (fourth). In the figures event, the novice competitors skated one figure, and the juniors and seniors skated three.

The event served to help choose the U.S. team to the 1997 World Championships. The 1997 World Junior Championships had been held prior to the national championships and so the World Junior Championships team had been chosen at a World Juniors selection competition earlier in the year.

Senior results

Men
Michael Weiss attempted to become the first American to land the quad toe loop and was initially believed to have been successful but three hours after the competition, U.S. Figure Skating ruled the jump had been two-footed and did not ratify it.

Ladies
World Champion Michelle Kwan was the frontrunner but had a free skating where she fell twice and landed three clean triples. Lipinski won the title and became the youngest U.S. ladies' champion, ahead of Sonya Klopfer who won the title in 1951 at the age of 15. She also performed the first triple loop-triple loop combo ever in her free skating.

Pairs

Ice dancing

Junior results

Men

Ladies

Pairs

Ice dancing

Novice results

Men

Ladies

Pairs

Ice dancing

Figures results

Senior men

Senior ladies

Junior men

Junior ladies

Novice men

Novice ladies

References

External links
 1997 U.S. Championships (Archived 2009-07-21)

U.S. Figure Skating Championships
United States Figure Skating Championships, 1997
United States Figure Skating Championships, 1997
February 1997 sports events in the United States
Sports competitions in Nashville, Tennessee